The Lane Theater in Williamsburg, Kentucky, located at 508 Main St., is an Art Deco-style building which was built in 1948.  It was listed on the National Register of Historic Places in 2004.

The first-floor level of the facade "is covered in yellow and brown horizontal striped panels of enameled metal, accented with chrome"; the facade further above "is faced in vertical yellow and brown striped panels of enameled metal surrounding second floor glass block windows."

References

Theatres on the National Register of Historic Places in Kentucky
Art Deco architecture in Kentucky
Theatres completed in 1948
National Register of Historic Places in Whitley County, Kentucky
1948 establishments in Kentucky